Nozadze is a Georgian surname. Common variations include Nazadze, Nozatze, and Nosadze. Notable people with the surname include:

Lasha Nozadze (born 1980), Georgian football player
Ramaz Nozadze (born 1983), Georgian wrestler

Georgian-language surnames
Surnames of Georgian origin